Aleksandar Stoimirović (born December 11, 1982) is a Serbian former footballer.

Career
Born in Kragujevac, SR Serbia, SFR Yugoslavia, Stoimirović began his career with Radnički Obrenovac and signed in summer 2004 a contract with Hajduk Kula, after two years here signed in November 2006 for Ukrainian club Vorskla. After just one and a half year left Vorskla and signed in July 2008 for Chernomorets. He joined on 8 October 2009 on trial to FC Schalke 04 and will play in two friendly games.

Later he played with FK Čukarički and FK Borac Čačak in the Serbian SuperLiga, and with FC Petrolul Ploiești and Pécsi Mecsek FC in, respectively, Romanian and Hungarian top leagues.  In summer 2013 he returned to Serbia and joined his hometown top flight club FK Radnički 1923.

References

External links
 
 
 Profile and stats at Srbijafudbal
 Early career on another page of Srbijafudbal
 Aleksandar Stoimirović Stats at Utakmica.rs

1982 births
Living people
Sportspeople from Kragujevac
Serbian footballers
Association football midfielders
FK Radnički Obrenovac players
C.D. Nacional players
FK Hajduk Kula players
FC Vorskla Poltava players
PFC Chernomorets Burgas players
FK Čukarički players
FK Borac Čačak players
FC Petrolul Ploiești players
Pécsi MFC players
FK Radnički 1923 players
FK Jagodina players
Serbian SuperLiga players
Ukrainian Premier League players
First Professional Football League (Bulgaria) players
Liga I players
Serbian expatriate footballers
Expatriate footballers in Portugal
Expatriate footballers in Ukraine
Expatriate footballers in Bulgaria
Expatriate footballers in Romania
Expatriate footballers in Hungary
Expatriate footballers in Greece
Serbian expatriate sportspeople in Portugal
Serbian expatriate sportspeople in Ukraine
Serbian expatriate sportspeople in Bulgaria
Serbian expatriate sportspeople in Romania
Serbian expatriate sportspeople in Hungary
Serbian expatriate sportspeople in Greece